Zelus exsanguis is a species of insect.

Description 
13–16 mm long. Yellowish-brown to reddish-brown in color. Pronotum with sharp pronotal spines.

Range 
Mexico to Panama.

Habitat

Ecology

Etymology

Taxonomy

References 

Reduviidae